Ectaga promeces is a moth in the family Depressariidae. It was described by Walsingham in 1912. It is found in Guatemala.

The wingspan is about 19 mm. The forewings are fawn-brown, mixed with brownish fuscous and some brownish cinereous scaling. There is an elongate patch of raised brownish fuscous scales immediately below the middle of the fold and a series of four small discal spots, also consisting of raised brownish fuscous scales being distributed alternately along the upper and lower margins of the cell, the first and third in the upper series, the second and fourth in the lower, the latter about the lower angle of the cell. The hindwings are greyish brown, slightly paler toward the base.

References

Moths described in 1912
Ectaga